Events in the year 1914 in Mexico.

Incumbents

Federal government 
 President -Victoriano Huerta, Francisco Carvajal, Venustiano Carranza
Secretary of the Interior: Ignacio Alcocer, José María Luján, Eliseo Arredondo, Rafael Zubarán Capmay.

Governors
 Aguascalientes: 
 Campeche: Joaquín Mucel Acereto
 Chiapas: José Ascención González/Blas Corral/Pablo Villanueva
 Chihuahua: Fidel Ávila/Silvestre Terrazas/Ignacio C. Enríquez
 Coahuila: Bruno Neyra/Alfredo Breceda/Gustavo Espinoza Mireles
 Colima: Interim Governors
 Durango:  
 Guanajuato: Fernando Dávila
 Hidalgo: 
 Jalisco: Manuel Aguirre Berlanga/Manuel M. Diéguez/Julián Medina
 State of Mexico: Gustavo Baz/Pascual Morales y Molina
 Michoacán: 
 Morelos: Agustín Bretón y Trillanes/Gregorio G. Mejía/Pedro Ojeda/Genovevo de la O
 Nayarit: 
 Nuevo León: Antonio de la Paz Guerra/Antonio L. Villarreal
 Oaxaca: 
 Puebla: 
 Querétaro: Joaquín F. Chicarro/José Antonio Septién/Francisco Murguía/Federico Montes
 San Luis Potosí: Juan G. Barragán Rodríguez 
 Sinaloa: Ramón F. Iturbe
 Sonora: José María Maytorena
 Tabasco: Joaquín Ruiz/Luis Hernández Hermosillo/Heriberto Jara Corona
 Tamaulipas: Alfredo Ricaut/Andrés Osuna
 Tlaxcala:  
 Veracruz: 
 Yucatán: Salvador Alvarado Rubio
 Zacatecas:

Events 
 April 9 – Tampico Affair
 April 21 – United States occupation of Veracruz
 June 23 – Battle of Zacatecas (1914)
 July – Rural Guard is disbanded
 July 14 – Victoriano Huerta resigns from the Presidency of Mexico
 August – Venustiano Carranza and the Constitutionalist Army enter Mexico City
 October 10 to November 13 – Convention of Aguascalientes in which Venustiano Carranza is deposed as Number One Chief of the Mexican Revolution
 November 6 – Eulalio Gutiérrez is declared President of Mexico during the Convention of Aguascalientes
 November – Venustiano Carranza leaves Mexico City for Veracruz
 December – Pancho Villa and Emiliano Zapata occupy Mexico City
 December 4 – Pancho Villa and Emiliano Zapata meet in Xochimilco

Popular culture

Sports

Music

Film

Literature

Notable births
 March 31 – Octavio Paz, writer, poet, and diplomat, and the winner of the 1990 Nobel Prize in Literature
April 8 – María Félix, actress and singer (d. 2002)

Notable deaths

References

 
Years of the 20th century in Mexico
Mexico